Chit may refer to: 
Chit (board wargames), a type of wargame counter
Chit (name)
Chit, a voucher or certificate with monetary value
Blood chit, document requesting safe passage and assistance for military personnel stranded in enemy territory
Chit fund, a savings scheme practiced in India
Chitting, a method of preparing potatoes for planting
Cit (consciousness), concept found in Indian religions

See also
Chitty Chitty Bang Bang